Odontonia bagginsi (more commonly known as Hobbit shrimp) is a tiny species of shrimp with eight hairy limbs. It was discovered in 2009 by Leiden University biology student Werner de Gier and shrimp researcher Dr. Charles Fransen in Ternate, Indonesia. The name came from the novel The Hobbit starring Bilbo Baggins as the fictional “hobbit” characters have hairy feet. Genetic characters of the shrimp were entered in the online database tree of life.

References

Palaemonoidea
Organisms named after Tolkien and his works
Taxa named by Charles Fransen
Crustaceans described in 2018